Anzhelika Vetoshkina (born 5 December 1994) is a Russian freestyle wrestler of Udmurt heritage.

In 2018, she won one of the bronze medals in the women's 50 kg event at the Klippan Lady Open in Klippan, Sweden. In the same year, she also competed in the women's freestyle 50 kg event at the 2018 World Wrestling Championships held in Budapest, Hungary. She was eliminated in her second match by Sun Yanan of China.

In 2019, she competed in the women's freestyle 50 kg event at the 2019 European Games held in Minsk, Belarus. She was eliminated in her first match by Miglena Selishka of Bulgaria.

In 2020, she won one of the bronze medals in the women's 53 kg event at the 2020 Individual Wrestling World Cup held in Belgrade, Serbia.

In 2022, she competed at the Yasar Dogu Tournament held in Istanbul, Turkey.

References

External links 
 

Living people
1994 births
Sportspeople from Izhevsk
Russian female sport wrestlers
Wrestlers at the 2019 European Games
European Games competitors for Russia
20th-century Russian women
21st-century Russian women